Events in the year 2018 in Latvia.

Incumbents
President: Raimonds Vējonis
Prime Minister: Māris Kučinskis
Speaker: Ināra Mūrniece

Events
 October 6 – The 2018 Latvian parliamentary election is held to elect All 100 members of the Saeima, Latvia's unicameral legislature.

Births

Deaths
24 January – Aleksandrs Kublinskis, composer (born 1936)
2 April – Morris Halle, Latvian-American linguist (born 1923)

References

 
2010s in Latvia
Years of the 21st century in Latvia
Latvia